Délices is a village and gold mine in French Guiana, in the commune of Mana. The gold mine is being exploited by the Auplata Mining Group. Délices is one of the biggest placers in French Guiana. Délices is located on the Arouani River which is locally heavily polluted with mercury.

See also
 Coulor
 Montagne d'Or mine

References

Gold mines in French Guiana
Mana, French Guiana
Villages in French Guiana